Solanum clokeyi, known as Clokey's nightshade,  Island nightshade, or Santa Cruz Island nightshade, is a species of flowering plant in the nightshade family endemic to California, United States. It occurs in southeastern California, including the Channel Islands and Santa Catalina Island. The name honors American botanist Ira Waddell Clokey. It is sometimes treated as a synonym or variety of Solanum wallacei.

References

clokeyi
Endemic flora of California
Flora without expected TNC conservation status